Ľuboš Benkovský (born 22 February 1989) is a Slovak professional football manager and a former player, who last managed ViOn Zlaté Moravce in the Fortuna Liga.

References

External links

 Futbalnet profile

1989 births
Living people
Sportspeople from Trnava
Slovak footballers
Slovak football managers
FC Horses Šúrovce players
FC Neded players
3. Liga (Slovakia) players
4. Liga (Slovakia) players
FC Lokomotíva Košice managers
FK Slavoj Trebišov managers
FC ViOn Zlaté Moravce managers
Slovak Super Liga managers
2. Liga (Slovakia) managers
Association footballers not categorized by position